Celine Tedenby (born 15 June 1999) is a Swedish ice hockey player and member of the Swedish national team, currently playing with the Merrimack Warriors women's ice hockey program in the Hockey East (HEA) conference of the NCAA Division I.

She represented Sweden at the 2022 IIHF Women's World Championship.

Playing career 
As a child, Tedenby developed in the minor ice hockey department of Jarveds IF in her hometown of Örnsköldsvik, on the east coast of Sweden in the north-central historical province of Ångermanland.

Her debut in the premier senior national league, the Riksserien (called Swedish Women's Hockey League since 2016), was made with MODO Hockey Dam in the 2014–15 season, at age fifteen. Playing with MODO, Tedenby steadily improved season-over-season from 7 points (6 goals+1 assists) in 27 games as a rookie in 2014–15 to 13 points (9+4) in 35 games in 2015–16, 22 points (15+7) in 34 games in 2016–17, and 26 points (15+11) in 36 games in 2017–18, her final season with the club.

NCAA 
Tedenby relocated to the United States in 2018 to began her college ice hockey career with the Maine Black Bears women's ice hockey program in the Hockey East conference of the NCAA Division I. As a freshman, she was twice named the Hockey East Rookie of the Week and was selected as the NCAA Third Star of the Week after tallying 5 points (3+2) in a weekend doubleheader against Dartmouth in November. She finished the 2018–19 season as the Black Bears' top point earner, 

Presented with the opportunity to play a fifth year of NCAA college eligibility due to the COVID-19 pandemic, Tedenby joined the Merrimack Warriors women's ice hockey program, also in the Hockey East conference, for the 2022–23 season.

International play 
As a member of the Swedish national under-18 team, Tedenby participated in the IIHF U18 Women's World Championship tournaments in 2015, 2016, and 2017. She was Sweden’s highest goal scorer at the 2016 tournament, contributing to the team's bronze medal victory.

She made her IIHF Women's World Championship debut with the Swedish national team in 2022, recording an assist in six games played.

Personal life 
Tedenby holds a bachelor's degree in social work from the University of Maine and, is pursuing a Master of Public Affairs degree at Merrimack College in North Andover, Massachusetts.

Her cousin, Mattias Tedenby, is also an ice hockey player. He was drafted by the New Jersey Devils in the 2008 NHL Entry Draft and has played most of his career with HV71 in the Swedish Hockey League.

Career statistics

Regular season and playoffs

International

References

Note

External links 
 

1999 births
Living people
Maine Black Bears women's ice hockey players
Merrimack Warriors women's ice hockey players
Modo Hockey Dam players
People from Örnsköldsvik Municipality
Swedish expatriate ice hockey players in the United States
Swedish women's ice hockey centres